This article refers to the Lt. Governor. For the California Chief Justice, see Donald Wright.

Donald Orr Wright Sr. (November 18, 1892 – July 24, 1985) was a United States Republican politician from the state of Minnesota. He served in the state legislature and rose to the office of President pro Tempore of the Minnesota State Senate.

In 1953, when Ancher Nelsen resigned as Lieutenant Governor of Minnesota, Wright assumed that office and held it for the remainder of one term, serving with Governor C. Elmer Anderson.

References
Minnesota Historical Society
Minnesota Legislators Past and Present

1892 births
1985 deaths
Lieutenant Governors of Minnesota
Republican Party members of the Minnesota House of Representatives
Republican Party Minnesota state senators
20th-century American politicians